The Best Variety Research Writer is an award presented annually at the Star Awards, an annual ceremony held in Singapore where the media organisation Mediacorp recognises entertainers under their employment for outstanding performances of the year.

Recipients

2010s

2020s

References

Star Awards